STS-51-J was the 21st NASA Space Shuttle mission and the first flight of Space Shuttle Atlantis. It launched from Kennedy Space Center, Florida, on October 3, 1985, carrying a payload for the U.S. Department of Defense (DoD), and landed at Edwards Air Force Base, California, on October 7, 1985.

Crew

Backup crew

Crew notes 
All five astronauts on the secret mission were active-duty military officers. Before William A. Pailes was assigned to the STS-51-J flight, Mike Mullane was rumored to have been assigned as mission specialist 3 on his second trip to space.

Mission summary 
STS-51-J launched on October 3, 1985, at 15:15:30 UTC (11:15:30 a.m. EDT), from Launch Pad 39A at the Kennedy Space Center. The launch was delayed by 22 minutes and 30 seconds due to a problem with a main engine liquid hydrogen prevalve close remote power controller; the controller was showing a faulty "on" indication.

The mission was the second shuttle flight totally dedicated to deploying a United States Department of Defense payload, after STS-51-C. Its cargo was classified, but it was reported that two (USA-11 and USA-12) DSCS-III (Defense Satellite Communications System) satellites were launched into geostationary orbits by an Inertial Upper Stage (IUS). The DSCS satellites used X-band frequencies (8/7 GHz). Each DSCS-III satellite had a design life of ten years, although several of the DSCS satellites have far exceeded their design life expectancy.

The mission was deemed successful. After a flight lasting 4 days, 1 hour, 44 minutes and 38 seconds, Atlantis landed on Runway 23 at Edwards Air Force Base at 17:00:08 UTC (13:00:08 EDT) on October 7, 1985. During STS-51-J, mission commander Bobko became the first astronaut to fly on three different shuttle orbiters, and the only astronaut to fly on the maiden voyages of two different orbiters.

Mission insignia  
The 51-J mission insignia, designed by Atlantiss first crew, pays tribute to the Statue of Liberty and the ideas it symbolizes, but also as not to emphasize the "classified" nature of the mission like the first one did. The historical gateway figure bears additional significance for astronauts Karol J. Bobko, mission commander; and Ronald J. Grabe, pilot, both New York City natives.

Gallery

See also 

 List of human spaceflights
 List of Space Shuttle missions

References

External links 
 NASA mission summary

Space Shuttle missions
Edwards Air Force Base
1985 in spaceflight
1985 in the United States
Spacecraft launched in 1985
Spacecraft which reentered in 1985
Department of Defense Space Shuttle missions
October 1985 events